Durmersheim is a small town in the district of Rastatt, Baden-Württemberg, Southwest Germany and has a population of 12,112 (2020).

Durmersheim is situated between Karlsruhe and Rastatt, in the valley of the river Rhine near the border to France. There is also a forest in the valley, named Hardtwald, c. 2 km east of the town.

History
Founded about 600 BC, the city was occupied by duke Otto of Worms in 985. Since 1300 Durmersheim belonged to the margraves of Baden.

As Germany was subdued and divided into control zones by the Allied forces after World War II, the border of the French zone and American zone was between Durmersheim and Rheinstetten.

Mayor
Since 2006 Andreas Augustin is the mayor of Durmersheim. He was reelected in 2014 with 54,38 % of the votes.

Main sights
The church of Bickesheim, built in the 13th century, is a well known place of pilgrimage.

References

External links
 Official Website (in German)

Populated places established in the 7th century
Rastatt (district)